The International Association of Scientific Experts in Tourism (AIEST, Association internationale d'experts scientifiques du tourisme ) is an international organisation of scientific and practical experts in tourism. It was founded in 1951. The proceedings of its annual conference have been published in journals including Journal of Travel Research and Anatolia.

It published the journal Tourism Review until 2016. The journal is now published by Emerald.

References

External links

Association internationale d'experts scientifiques du tourisme (AIEST) profile from Union of International Associations

Tourism
International professional associations
International learned societies
Organizations established in 1951